The 1988–89 Serie A season was the 55th season of the Serie A, the top level of ice hockey in Italy. 10 teams participated in the league, and AS Varese Hockey won the championship by defeating HC Fassa in the final.

First round

Final round

Group A

Group B

Playoffs

Semifinals 
 AS Varese Hockey - HC Bozen 2:0 (3:2, 7:3)
 Asiago Hockey - HC Fassa 1:2 (8:7, 3:4 OT, 2:8)

Final
 AS Varese Hockey - HC Fassa 3:0 (2:1 OT, 6:0, 4:2)

External links
 Season on hockeyarchives.info

1988-89
Italy
Serie